Donna may refer to the short form of the honorific nobildonna, the female form of Don (honorific) in Italian.

People
Donna (given name); includes name origin and list of people and characters with the name
 Roberto Di Donna (born 1968), Italian sports shooter
 Fernand Donna (1922–1988), French sprint canoeist

Places
Donna, Texas, USA
Dønna, Norway
 Donna (crater), a tiny lunar crater on the near side of the Moon

Music
 The Donnas, American all-girl rock band
 Donna (radio station), former Flemish music radio station located in Belgium
 Donna (album), album by Donna Cruz
 "Donna" (Ritchie Valens song), a 1958 song by Ritchie Valens, covered in the United Kingdom by Marty Wilde
 "Donna" (10cc song), a 1972 song by 10cc
 "Donna", song from Hair
"Donna", song by Wally Lewis
 "Donna, Donna", a Yiddish song
 "Donna the Prima Donna", a 1963 song by Dion

Other
 Hurricane Donna, Category 4 Atlantic hurricane in 1960
 Una donna, 1906 novel by Sibilla Aleramo
 Doona, in Australian English a generic trademark for a duvet or quilt, after the first local manufacturer